Notonomus obscurus is a species of ground beetle in the subfamily Pterostichinae. It was described by Moore in 1963.

References

Notonomus
Beetles described in 1963